McGavock may refer to:

People
Randal McGavock (1766–1843), Mayor of Nashville, Tennessee from 1824 to 1825
John McGavock (1815–1893), Southern planter in Nashville, Tennessee
Randal William McGavock (1826–1863), Southern planter, Mayor of Nashville, Tennessee from 1858 to 1859
Jacob McGavock Dickinson (1851–1928), United States Secretary of War from 1909 to 1911.

Places
McGavock Family Cemetery, a cemetery in Fort Chiswell, Virginia
David S. McGavock House, near Dublin, Virginia.
McGavock Confederate Cemetery, a Confederate cemetery in Franklin, Tennessee
McGavock–Gaines House in Franklin, Tennessee
McGavock-Gatewood-Webb House, historic house in Nashville, Tennessee
McGavock Elementary School, a public elementary school in Nashville, Tennessee
McGavock Comprehensive High School, a public high school in Nashville, Tennessee
McGavock Lake Water Aerodrome in Canada